Gender Equality in Lebanon is the attempt that all men and women should receive equal treatment in all aspects of the society without discrimination on their sex. Equality in Lebanon has witnessed controlled attempts towards achieving  gender equality. For example, Lebanon was a leading country in the middle east region and pioneered female rights to be enrolled in politics in 1953. Another important date in the Lebanese context to fight gender biases was 1996 where Lebanon endorsed the Convention on the Elimination all Forms of Discrimination Against Women (CEDAW). One of the main reasons for this gap in promoting gender equality is attributed to the over all education policies in the country where the present curricula is irrelevant to advocate for gender equality. Adding to this, some believe that cultural concerns play a big role in this educational tendency of overshadowing gender equality where still women's' roles in society are viewed with a lot of biases and discriminations perceptions.

History 
Lebanon is considered as one of the most active countries in the middle east calling for women empowerment and gender equality both on the legal and societal levels. These attempts for change has been influenced by many conflicts and wars that took place within and around the country. Discrimination is practiced among different sectors and professions and this gap differs from one sector to another. Culture plays a big role in widening the gender gap in Lebanon.

Gender equality and education 
The UNDP and other partners of UN global community made gander equality a major concern within the Lebanese context. There was an increase number of female enrollment in primary education compared to what it was like   15 years ago. Females today represent around  41 percent of paid employees in different industries.

Activity gallery

References

External links 
 KAFA
 The Lebanese Democratic Women’s Gathering (RDFL)
 .Lebanon Family Planning Association for Development & Family Empowerment (LFPADE)
 Justice Without Frontiers (JWF)
 Palestinian Arab Women League
 Marsa Sexual Health Center
 Nasawiya
 ABAAD
 The Arab Institute for Women

Lebanon
Society of Lebanon